The Rio Grande de Mindanao, also known as the Mindanao River, is the second-largest river system in the Philippines. It is an important transportation artery, used mainly in transporting agricultural products and, formerly, timber.

Its headwaters are in the mountains of Impasugong, Bukidnon, south of Gingoog in Misamis Oriental, where it is called the Pulangi River. Joining the Kabacan River, it becomes the Mindanao River. Flowing out of the mountains, it forms the center of a broad, fertile plain in the southcentral portion of the island. Before its mouth in the Illana Bay, it splits into two parallel sections, the Cotabato and Tamontaka, separated by a  hill.

Population centers along the river include Cotabato City, Datu Piang and Midsayap.

Course

The Rio Grande de Mindanao has its source in the Central Mindanao Highlands near the northern coast of the island, specifically on the northeastern part of the province of Bukidnon, where it is known as the Pulangi River. It then flows southward across the Bukidnon Plateau, fed up by its tributaries along the way and then emerges onto the Cotabato plains, depositing fertile mountain silt as it widens and arcs westward through the Cotabato River Basin. It finally empties into Illana Bay at its mouth at Cotabato City.

As the Mindanao River meets Illana Bay, it branches out into two distributaries, the Cotabato in the north and the Tamontaka in the south at Cotabato City.

Tributaries

Rio Grande de Mindanao River List of tributaries by length.

 Pulangi River 
 Kabulnan River 
 Allah River 
 Buluan River 
 Simuay River 
 Libungan River 
 M'lang River

Water hyacinths

The river has recently been clogged with water hyacinths, causing it to overflow after days of heavy rain. Floodwaters submerged at least 37 villages in Cotabato City alone and displaced some 6,000 families.

References

External links

Rivers of the Philippines
Geography of Mindanao
Landforms of Bukidnon
Landforms of Cotabato
 
Landforms of Maguindanao del Norte
Landforms of Maguindanao del Sur